Supper at Emmaus is an undated oil on canvas painting by the Dutch or Flemish painter Matthias Stom. It was bought by the town of Grenoble in 1826 and now hangs in Grenoble Museum. It depicts the scene described in the Gospel of John, when the Emmaus disciples recognize Jesus when He was breaking the bread.

References

Paintings by Matthias Stom
Paintings in the collection of the Museum of Grenoble
Paintings depicting the Supper at Emmaus